Tony Britten is a British composer, best known for adapting the music and writing the text of the UEFA Champions League Anthem.

Career
Britten was educated at Trinity School, Croydon and the Royal College of Music. He spent the first few years of his career in theatre as a musical director, including working for Cameron Mackintosh as music supervisor on many shows including Godspell, The Rocky Horror Show and Oliver!. After that he worked at the National Theatre as arranger/musical director. He then moved into film and television as a conductor on productions such as RoboCop. He also worked for director Clive Donner.

In 1992, UEFA commissioned Britten to arrange an anthem for the UEFA Champions League which commenced in November 1992. Britten borrowed heavily from George Frideric Handel's Zadok the Priest (one of his Coronation Anthems), and the piece was performed by London's Royal Philharmonic Orchestra and sung by the Academy of St. Martin in the Fields.

In 1994, he composed the music for the Christmas animated special Mole's Christmas, and in 1999 he wrote and directed Bohème, a film based on the Puccini opera, which was broadcast by Five and Artsworld. In 2007 Britten adapted and directed a film version of Oliver Goldsmith’s comedy She Stoops to Conquer for Sky Arts. He also returned to composing for sports events by writing the official anthem of Mustafa V. Koç Sports Award the same year.

He has also directed a number of films, including a documentary about his unrelated namesake, Benjamin Britten: Peace and Conflict (2013).

References

External links
 

English composers
Alumni of the Royal College of Music
Musicians from Norfolk
Living people
Year of birth missing (living people)